In the mathematical theory of automorphic representations, a multiplicity-one theorem is a result about the representation theory of an adelic reductive algebraic group. The multiplicity in question is the number of times a given abstract group representation is realised in a certain space, of square-integrable functions, given in a concrete way.

A multiplicity one theorem may also refer to a result about the restriction of a representation of a group G to a subgroup H. In that context, the pair (G, H) is called a strong Gelfand pair.

Definition
Let G be a reductive algebraic group over a number field K and let A denote the adeles of K. Let Z denote the centre of G and let  be a continuous unitary character from Z(K)\Z(A)× to C×. Let L20(G(K)/G(A), ) denote the space of cusp forms with central character ω on G(A). This space decomposes into a direct sum of Hilbert spaces

where the sum is over irreducible subrepresentations and m are non-negative integers.

The group of adelic points of G, G(A), is said to satisfy the multiplicity-one property if any smooth irreducible admissible representation of G(A) occurs with multiplicity at most one in the space of cusp forms of central character , i.e. m is 0 or 1 for all such .

Results
Multiplicity-one also holds for SL(2), but not for SL(n) for n > 2 .

Strong multiplicity one theorem

See also 

 Gan-Gross-Prasad conjecture

References

Representation theory of groups
Automorphic forms
Theorems in number theory
Theorems in representation theory